Jonathan Keith Nunnally (born November 9, 1971) is a former professional baseball outfielder. He played in the major leagues from 1995-2000. He also played part of 2000 with the Orix BlueWave in Japan.

Playing career
Nunnally's major-league career began in 1995, after the Kansas City Royals drafted him from the Cleveland Indians' organization in the 1994 Rule 5 draft. He made his debut on April 29, 1995, hitting a home run off of New York Yankees pitcher Melido Perez in his first at-bat.

In , while playing for the Indianapolis Indians in the Pittsburgh Pirates organization, Nunnally tested positive for steroids, and received a 15-game suspension, in what would be Nunnally's last season as a professional player.

Coaching career
After retiring, Nunnally went into coaching. On December 8, 2009, he was named the new hitting coach for the Indians, a position he held until being fired on June 19, 2011.

On January 7, 2013, the Toronto Blue Jays announced that Nunnally would be the hitting coach for their Triple-A affiliate Buffalo Bisons. He was moved to the Double-A New Hampshire Fisher Cats hitting coach on January 13, 2014.

In January 2015, he was hired as the hitting coach for the Salem Red Sox, a minor league affiliate of the Boston Red Sox. In January 2016, he was announced as the hitting coach of the Portland Sea Dogs.

In February 2018, he was announced as the outfield and base running coordinator for the Los Angeles Angels farm system.

In 2019, he joined the Pittsburgh Pirates organization and served as the hitting coach for the Altoona Curve. Before the 2020 season, he was announced as the hitting coach for the Indianapolis Indians.  In 2022, Nunnally was again named Hitting Coach for the Altoona Curve.

References

External links

1971 births
Living people
African-American baseball coaches
African-American baseball players
American sportspeople in doping cases
American expatriate baseball players in Japan
American expatriate baseball players in Mexico
Baseball coaches from North Carolina
Baseball players from North Carolina
Baseball players suspended for drug offenses
Boston Red Sox players
Cincinnati Reds players
Columbus RedStixx players
Indianapolis Indians players
Kansas City Royals players
Kinston Indians players
Major League Baseball outfielders
Miami Dade Sharks baseball players
Minor league baseball coaches
Memphis Redbirds players
Mexican League baseball center fielders
Naranjeros de Hermosillo players
New York Mets players
Nippon Professional Baseball outfielders
Omaha Golden Spikes players
Omaha Royals players
Orix BlueWave players
Pawtucket Red Sox players
Piratas de Campeche players
Watertown Indians players
21st-century African-American sportspeople
20th-century African-American sportspeople
Hargrave Military Academy alumni